David Empringham (born December 28, 1963) is a Canadian auto racing driver. He is a two-time Toyota Atlantic, one-time Indy Lights and two-time Continental Tire Sports Car Challenge champion. Most recently, Empringham won the 2012 Grand-Am Continental Tire Sports Car Challenge GS class driver's title with co-driver John Farano.

Born in Toronto, Ontario, Empringham began his racing career in 1987, competing in the Spenard/David Formula 2000 series. He then competed regularly in the GM Motorsport series (teammate of Canadian racing legend Richard Spenard) for several years, drove a handful of races in the IMSA Firestone Firehawk series, the Porsche Turbo Cup and Formula Toyota Atlantic.

In 1992, Empringham began competing full-time in the Toyota Atlantic Championship, where he won back-to-back championships in 1993 and 1994. In 1993 David won the Championship with "underdog" CANASKA racing and Canadian Tire sponsorship, based out of Toronto, Ontario. 1994 saw Empringham move to the BDJS racing team, based in Indianapolis, Indiana, taking the Canadian Tire sponsorship with him. 1995 saw Empringham narrowly miss winning a third championship, being beat out by Richie Hearn for the title.

1996 saw Empringham make the move to Indy Lights, replacing Greg Moore, who had moved up to the team's CART operation, in the Player's/Forsythe racing Lola. 1996 saw many wins including a thrilling victory in the fastest Indy Lights race ever run on the high banks of Michigan International Speedway during the Inaugural US 500 weekend in May, and ultimately another Championship for "Emp's" mantle, taking the 1996 Indy Lights Title. 1997 saw some successes, but no championship.

In 2001, after several years out of the spotlight, David began competing Part-time in Grand-Am Cup and Grand-Am Motorola series races. During the 2005 season, he managed 2 victories and 8 top-ten finishes on his way to the GS series title with co-driver Scott Maxwell driving for Multimatic Motorsports.

Since then, Empringham has competed in a Mitsubishi Lancer Evolution in Time Attack events for the Sierra Sierra Enterprises (USA) team. Empringham is a two-time runner up at the World Time Attack Challenge in Sydney, Australia (2010, 2011), both times losing out to Tarzan Yamada, who drives for the Japanese Cyber Evo team in a similar Mitsubishi Lancer Evolution.

In 2012 Empringham returned to full-time racing in the Continental Tire Sports Car Challenge with co-driver John Farano in the #83 BGB Motorsports Porsche Carrera. After a consistent season of points finished (however no wins), Empringham and John won the 2012 driver's title. In 2013, Dave returned to Multimatic Motorsports with Farano to compete in the CTSCC series in the #15 Aston Martin Vantage V8 Grand-Am race car.

References

External links

1963 births
24 Hours of Daytona drivers
Atlantic Championship drivers
Indy Lights champions
Indy Lights drivers
Living people
Racing drivers from Ontario
Rolex Sports Car Series drivers
Sportspeople from Toronto
WeatherTech SportsCar Championship drivers
Multimatic Motorsports drivers